The Deluge was a fireboat operated, for decades, in Baltimore, Maryland.  When built, in 1911, her capacity to pump 12,000 gallons per minute made her one of the most powerful fireboats.

In 1917 the Deluge played a key role in fighting a fire at Baltimore's historic Pier 9, that spread to the British freighter 
She helped fight another fire, in 1917, near a munition plant.

Notes

References

Fireboats of Maryland
1911 ships